This is an alphabetical list of articles pertaining specifically to mechanical engineering. For a broad overview of engineering, please see List of engineering topics. For biographies please see List of engineers.

A
Acceleration –
Accuracy and precision –
Actual mechanical advantage –
Aerodynamics –
Agitator (device) –
Air handler –
Air conditioner –
Air preheater –
Allowance –
American Machinists' Handbook –
American Society of Mechanical Engineers –
Ampere –
Applied mechanics –
Antifriction –
Archimedes' screw –
Artificial intelligence –
Automaton clock –
Automobile –
Automotive engineering –
Axle –
Air Compressor

B
Backlash –
Balancing –
Beale Number –
Bearing –
Belt (mechanical) –
Bending –
Biomechatronics –
Bogie –
Brittle –
Buckling –
Bus--
Bushing –
Boilers & boiler systems
BIW--

C
CAD –
CAM –
CAID –
Calculator –
Calculus –
Car handling –
Carbon fiber –
Classical mechanics –
Clean room design –
Clock –
Clutch –
CNC –
Coefficient of thermal expansion –
Coil spring –
Combustion –
Composite material –
Compression ratio –
Compressive strength –
Computational fluid dynamics –
Computer –
Computer-aided design –
Computer-aided industrial design –
Computer-numerically controlled –
Conservation of mass –
Constant-velocity joint –
Constraint –
Continuum mechanics –
Control theory –
Corrosion –
Cotter pin –
Crankshaft –
Cybernetics –

D
Damping ratio –
Deformation (engineering) –
Delamination –
Design –
Diesel Engine –
Differential –
Dimensionless number –
Diode –
Diode laser –
Drafting –
Drifting –
Driveshaft –
Dynamics –
Design for Manufacturability for CNC machining –

E
Elasticity –
Elasticity tensor -
Electric motor –
Electrical engineering –
Electrical circuit –
Electrical network –
Electromagnetism –
Electronic circuit –
Electronics –
Energy –
Engine –
Engineering –
Engineering cybernetics –
Engineering drawing –
Engineering economics –
Engineering ethics –
Engineering management –
Engineering society –
Exploratory engineering –

F
( Fits and tolerances)---
Factor of safety –
False precision –
Fast fracture –
Fatigue –
Fillet –
Finite element analysis –
Fluid mechanics –
Flywheel –
Force –
Force density –
Four-stroke cycle –
Four wheel drive –
Friction –
Front wheel drive –
Fundamentals of Engineering exam –
Fusible plug –
Fusion Deposition Modelling –   
forging

G
Gas compressor –
Gauge –
Gauge (engineering) –
Gauge, rail –
Gear –
Gear coupling –
Gear ratio –
Granular material –

H
Heat engine –
Heat transfer –
Heating and cooling systems –
Hinge –
Hooke's law –
Hotchkiss drive –
HVAC –
Hydraulics –
Hydrostatics –

I
Ideal machine –
Ideal mechanical advantage –
Imperial College London –
Inclined plane –
Independent suspension –
Inductor –
Industrial engineering –
Inertia –
Institution of Mechanical Engineers –
Instrumentation –
Integrated circuit –
Invention –

J
Joule – Junction

K
Kelvin –
Kinematic determinacy –
Kinematics –

L
Laser –
Leaf spring –
Lever –
Liability –
Life cycle cost analysis –
Limit state design –
Live axle –
Load transfer –
Locomotive –
Lubrication –

M
Machine –
Machine learning –
Magnetic circuit –
Margin of safety –
Mass transfer –
Materials –
Materials engineering –
Material selection –
Mechanical advantage –
Mechanical Biological Treatment –
Mechanical efficiency –
Mechanical engineering –
Mechanical equilibrium –
Mechanical work –
Mechanics –
Mechanochemistry –
Mechanosynthesis –
Mechatronics –
Micromachinery –
Microprocessor –
Microtechnology –
modulus of rigidity--
Molecular assembler –
Molecular nanotechnology –
Moment –
Moment of inertia –
Motorcycle –
Multi-link suspension

N
Nanotechnology –
Normal stress –
Nozzle –

O
(orientation)--Overdrive –
Oversteer –

P
Pascal (unit) –
Physics –
Pinion –
Piston –
Pitch drop experiment –
Plasma processing –
Plasticity –
Pneumatics –
Poisson's ratio –
Position vector –
Potential difference –
Power –
Power stroke –
Pressure –
Prime mover –
Process control –
Product Lifecycle Management –
Professional Engineer –
Project management –
Pulley –
Pump –

Q
Quality –
Quality control--
quality assurance

R
Rack and pinion –
Rack railway –
Railcar –
Rail gauge –
Railroad car –
Railroad switch –
Rail tracks –
Reaction kinetics –
Rear wheel drive –
Refrigeration –
Reliability engineering –
Relief valve –
RepRap Project –
Resistive force –
Resistor –
Reverse engineering –
Rheology –
Rigid body –
Robotics –
Roller chain –
Rolling –
Rotordynamics –

S
Safety engineering –
Screw theory –
Seal –
Semiconductor –
Series and parallel circuits –
Shear force diagrams –
Shear pin –
Shear strength –
Shear stress –
Simple machine –
Simulation –
Slide rule –
Society of Automotive Engineers –
Solid mechanics –
Solid modeling –
Sprung mass –
Statics –
Steering –
Steam Systems –
Stress-strain curve –
Structural failure –
Student Design Competition –
Surveying –
Suspension –
Switch –

T
Technical drawing –
Technology –
Tensile strength –
Tensile stress –
Testing Adjusting Balancing –
Theory of elasticity –
Thermodynamics –
Toe –
Torque –
Torsion beam suspension –
Torsion spring –
Toughness –
Tramway track –
Transmission –
Truck –
Truck (railway) –
Turbine –
Tribology –
touch screen  – 
tear –
Tire manufacturing--

U
Understeer –
Unibody –
Unsprung weight –

V
Verification and Validation –
Valve –
Vector –
Vertical strength –
Viscosity –
Volt –
Vibration –
Velocity diagrams –

W
Weapon -
Wear –
Wedge –
Weight transfer –
Wheel –
Wheel and axle –
Wheelset –

X
x bar charts

Y
Yield strength –
Young's modulus –

Z
Zeroth Law of Thermodynamics

See also

Mechanical engineering
Mechanical engineering topics